Olenecamptus indianus is a species of beetle in the family Cerambycidae. It was described by Thomson in 1857, originally under the genus Authades. It is known from Myanmar, Malaysia, Vietnam, Thailand, and India. It contains the varietas Olenecamptus indianus var. salweeni.

References

Dorcaschematini
Beetles described in 1857